Agnes Pareyio (born June 24, 1956) is a Maasai Kenyan women's rights activist, politician and founder and director of the Tasaru Ntomonok Rescue Center for Girls, an organization that campaigns against female genital cutting.

Biography 

Pareyio was born in 1956, the daughter of the village chief. After she underwent female genital mutilation at 14, against her will, she vowed to prevent FGM from happening to other girls.

Soon after her marriage at 18, Pareyio joined the Kenyan women's organization Maendeleo Ya Wanawake, where she became a leader. Her efforts eventually turned to fighting female genital mutilation.

An opponent of FGM, Pareyio teaches girls about the procedure, using wooden models of the female reproductive tract to show different types of FGM. She challenges cultural practices and engaging with communities that propagate the procedure, suggesting and demonstrating alternative female rites of passage.

Pareyio runs a safe house for young girls escaping from female genital mutilation. She works with each girl's family to help them understand the consequences of FGM and convince them to spare their daughter from the procedure. She also educates women who perform FGM about its harms.

Pareyio was the first Maasai women to be elected Deputy Mayor of her locality. Pareyio has also analyzed the patriarchal social effects of FGM, including the ways that the procedure is used to take girls out of education and other means of economic and social independence.

Pareyio was named United Nations in Kenya Person of the Year in 2005, for her work towards gender equality and women's empowerment.

References

External links
Rising to End FGM - Agnes Pareyio

1956 births
Living people
Kenyan health activists
Kenyan women's rights activists
Maasai people
Activists against female genital mutilation
Violence against women in Kenya
People from Narok County